Deh-e Bala (also Romanized as Deh-e Bālā; also known as Deh-e Now Bālā, Deh-i-Nau Bāla, and Deh Nau Bāla) is a village in Khenaman Rural District, in the Central District of Rafsanjan County, Kerman Province, Iran. At the 2006 census, its population was 45, in 12 families.

References 

Populated places in Rafsanjan County